Ultra Vivid Scene is the debut album by Ultra Vivid Scene, released in 1988. Kurt Ralske was the writer, producer, and sole performer.

Track listing

Singles
"She Screamed" (August 22, 1988)
 "She Screamed"
 "Walkin' After Midnight" (Patsy Cline cover)
 "Not in Love (Hit by a Truck)"
 "You Know It All" (on CD single only)
"Mercy Seat" (April 24, 1989)
 "Mercy Seat" (12" version)
 "Codine" (Buffy Sainte-Marie cover)
 "H Like in Heaven"
 "Mercy Seat" (album version)

Personnel
Kurt Ralske – vocals, instrumentation, producer, engineer

References

Ultra Vivid Scene albums
1988 debut albums
4AD albums